Biever is a surname. Notable people with the surname include:

Nicolas Biever (1894–1965), Luxembourgian politician
Tony Biever (1908–1990), Luxembourgish politician and jurist
Vernon Biever (1923–2010), American photographer

See also
Biever House
Biver (disambiguation)